Ottmar Obermaier (17 November 1883 – 30 January 1958) was a German sculptor. His work was part of the sculpture event in the art competition at the 1928 Summer Olympics.

References

1883 births
1958 deaths
20th-century German sculptors
20th-century German male artists
German male sculptors
Olympic competitors in art competitions
People from Traunstein (district)